Kenneth Williams (born 17 February 1937) is a British-Canadian former swimmer. He competed in two events at the 1956 Summer Olympics for Great Britain. Later, he would represent Canada at the Commonwealth Games.

References

1937 births
Living people
British male swimmers
Olympic swimmers of Great Britain
Swimmers at the 1956 Summer Olympics
Place of birth missing (living people)
Commonwealth Games medallists in swimming
Commonwealth Games silver medallists for Canada
Commonwealth Games bronze medallists for Canada
Swimmers at the 1958 British Empire and Commonwealth Games
Medallists at the 1958 British Empire and Commonwealth Games